The 2012 Spengler Cup was held in Davos, Switzerland, from December 26 to December 31, 2012. All matches were played at HC Davos's home known as Vaillant Arena. Six competing teams were split into two groups of three. The two groups, named Torriani and Cattini, were named after legendary Swiss hockey players Richard "Bibi" Torriani and the Cattini brothers, Hans and Ferdinand.

Teams participating
The list of teams that have been confirmed for the tournament are as listed:

 HC Davos (host)
 Team Canada
 Adler Mannheim
 HC Fribourg-Gottéron
 HC Vítkovice Steel
 Salavat Yulaev Ufa

The division of the six teams into two groups of three and the subsequent schedule were determined on 24 August 2012.

Due to the ongoing 2012–13 NHL lockout, some of the teams' rosters were bolstered by the presence of locked-out NHL players, with many of them joining Team Canada.

Match Officials
Here is the list of match officials that have been confirmed for the tournament:

Publications
For the first time, the Spengler Cup has made all of their available publications, including all matchday programmes and the event media guide, available for download on their website. The publications are available only in German.

Group stage

Key
W (regulation win) – 3 pts.
OTW (overtime/shootout win) – 2 pts.
OTL (overtime/shootout loss) – 1 pt.
L (regulation loss) – 0 pts.

Group Torriani

All times are local (UTC+1).

Group Cattini

All times are local (UTC+1).

Knockout stage

Key: * – final in overtime. ** – final in shootout.

Quarterfinals

All times are local (UTC+1).

Semifinals

All times are local (UTC+1).

Final

All times are local (UTC+1).

Champions

All-Star Team

Statistics

Scoring leaders

GP = Games Played G = Goals; A = Assists; Pts = Points

Television
Several television channels around the world will cover many or all matches of the Spengler Cup. As well as most Swiss channels, here is a listing of who else will cover the tournament:

Schweizer Radio und Fernsehen (Switzerland, host broadcaster)
The Sports Network (Canada)
Eurosport 2, British Eurosport, Eurosport Asia and Pacific, and Eurosport HD
Nova Sport (Czech Republic, Slovakia)

References

External links

2012-13
2012–13 in Swiss ice hockey
2012–13 in Russian ice hockey
2012–13 in Canadian ice hockey
2012–13 in German ice hockey
2012–13 in Czech ice hockey
December 2012 sports events in Europe